Vilma Nugis is an Estonian para skier.

At the 1994 Winter Paralympics in Lillehammer, she won a bronze medal in the Women's 5km free technique B3 (see Cross-country skiing at the 1994 Winter Paralympics).

References

Living people
Year of birth missing (living people)
Paralympic competitors for Estonia
Place of birth missing (living people)